Cordia boissieri is a white-flowered, evergreen shrub or small tree in the borage family (Boraginaceae). Its native range extends from southern Texas in the United States south to central Mexico. Common names include anacahuita, Mexican olive, white cordia, and Texas wild olive. It is named after the Swiss explorer and botanist Pierre Edmond Boissier.

Description

They are sweet but slightly toxic when fresh, causing dizziness in humans and other animals. The tree has a lifespan of 30–50 years.

Uses
Jellies made from the fruits are reportedly safe to eat.  A syrup made from the fruits is used to dye cloth and treat coughs.  The leaves are used to alleviate rheumatism and pulmonary illness.  The wood is used as firewood and for carpentry. Anacahuita is cultivated as an ornamental for its compact size and showy flowers. It is hardy to USDA Zone 9a.

Ecology
Cordia boissieri is a host plant for the wild olive tortoise beetle (Physonota alutacea).

Symbolism
Anacahuita is the official flower of the state of Nuevo León in Mexico.

References

External links

boissieri
Plants described in 1845
Trees of Coahuila
Trees of Nuevo León
Trees of San Luis Potosí
Trees of Tamaulipas
Trees of the South-Central United States
Trees of Veracruz
Flora of North America